The European Union Satellite Centre (EU SatCen; previously EUSC) is the agency of the European Union (EU) that supports the EU's decision-making in the field of the Common Foreign and Security Policy (CFSP), including crisis management missions and operations, by providing products and services resulting from the exploitation of relevant space assets and collateral data, including satellite and aerial imagery, and related services. SatCen is headquartered in the Torrejón Air Base, located in the Spanish municipality of the same name, in the vicinity of Madrid.

The staff of the centre, headed by Director Sorin Dumitru Ducaru, consists of experienced image analysts, geospatial specialists and supporting personnel, recruited from EU Member States. In addition, experts seconded from Member States work at the SatCen for periods ranging from six months to three years, and temporary staff are recruited as needed. SatCen assures technical development activities in direct support to its operational activities, as well as specialised training for image analysts.

The SatCen was initially founded in 1992 as the Western European Union Satellite Centre. It was incorporated as an EU agency on 1 January 2002. In June 2014, a new Council Decision replaced the former Council Joint Action of 2001 to modify SatCen's mission, aligning it with the evolution of the user demand and the developments of the EU's space activities relevant to CFSP (ref. 1), making it an essential interface with the European Geospatial Intelligence (GEOINT, ref. 2) community.

Ducaru became Director of SatCen in June 2019.

Production and users
In 2015, SatCen provided 1348 products for the benefit of a large community of users, such as the European External Action Service in general, but especially the EU Military Staff, the EU Intelligence Analysis Centre and the Civil Planning and Conduct Capability, as well as EU member states and international organisations.

See also
 Common Security and Defence Policy
 European External Action Service
 Military of the European Union
 European Union Institute for Security Studies
 European Defence Agency
 Western European Union
Joint European Union Intelligence School

References
Citations

Bibliography

External links
 June 2014 Council Decision
 About GEOINT
 EU Satellite Centre Annual Report 2015
 EU SatCen website
 CSDP structure, instruments, and agencies, EEAS website

Satellite Centre
2002 establishments in Spain
2002 in the European Union
Government agencies established in 2002
International organisations based in the Community of Madrid
Torrejón de Ardoz